Juan Pérez de Guzmán (1240–1285) was a Spanish nobleman, Lord of Guzmán, and Gumiel de Mercado.

Biography 

Juan was the son of Pedro Núñez de Guzmán and Urraca Garcia de Villamayor, a distinguished family, belonging to the Spanish nobility. His wife was María Ramírez, daughter of Ramiro Frolaz de Cifuentes, a nobleman descendant of Ramiro Fróilaz, and Teresa Núñez de Lara.

References 

13th-century Castilian nobility